This is a list of New York City parks. Three entities manage parks within New York City, each with its own responsibilities:

 Federal – US National Park Service (NPS) - both open-space and historic properties
 State – New York State Office of Parks, Recreation and Historic Preservation (NYSP)
 Municipal – New York City Department of Parks and Recreation (DPR)

The city has 28,000 acres (113 km²) of municipal parkland and 14 miles (22 km) of public municipal beaches. Major municipal parks include Central Park, Prospect Park, Flushing Meadows-Corona Park, and Forest Park. The largest is Pelham Bay Park, followed by the Staten Island Greenbelt and Van Cortlandt Park. There are also many smaller but historically significant parks in New York City, such as Battery Park, Bryant Park, Madison Square Park, Union Square Park, and Washington Square Park. 

Additionally, some parks, most notably Gramercy Park, are privately owned and managed. Access to these private parks may be restricted.

The City Parks Foundation offers more than 1200 free performing arts events in parks across the city each year, including Central Park Summerstage, the Charlie Parker Jazz Festival and dance, theater, and children's arts festivals.

Top ten parks by area

 Pelham Bay Park, Bronx - 
 Greenbelt, Staten Island - 
 Van Cortlandt Park, Bronx - 
 Flushing Meadows-Corona Park, Queens - 
 Central Park, Manhattan - 
 Freshkills Park, Staten Island - 
 Marine Park, Brooklyn - 
 Bronx Park, Bronx - 
 Alley Pond Park, Queens - 
 Forest Park, Queens - 

List of parks by borough

The New York City Department of Parks and Recreation maintains a complete list of all parks. Public parks listed below are managed by NYC Parks unless otherwise noted.

The Bronx

 Bronx Park
 New York Botanical Garden
 Bronx Zoo
 Bronx / Allerton Skate Park
 Starlight Park

East Bronx

 Agnes Haywood Playground*
 Allerton Playground
 Ambrosini Field
 Bicentennial Veterans Memorial Park
 Castle Hill Park
 Ferry Point Park
 Givans Creek Woods
 Haffen Park
 Harding Park
 Pelham Bay Park
 Orchard Beach
 Rodman's Neck
 Pugsley Creek Park
 Richman Park
 Seton Falls Park
 Seton Park
 Soundview Park

West Bronx

 Aqueduct Walk
 Bridge Park
 Devoe Park
 Ewen Park
 Harris Park
 Henry Hudson Park
 Jerome Park
 Poe Park, including Edgar Allan Poe Cottage
 Raoul Wallenberg Forest
 Riverdale Park
 Spuyten Duyvil Shorefront Park
 St. James Park
 University Woods
 Van Cortlandt Park
 Vidalia Park
 Vinmont Veteran Park
 Washington's Walk
 Wave Hill
 Williamsbridge Oval

South Bronx
A sub-section of West Bronx.

 A. Badillo Community Rose Garden and Park
 Abigail Playground
 Admiral Farragut Playground
 Alexander's Alley
 Arcilla Playground*
 Barretto Point Park
 Bill Rainey Park 
 Claremont Park
 Concrete Plant Park
 Crotona Park
 Estella Diggs Park
 Grant Park
 Hunts Point Riverside Park
 Joseph Rodman Drake Park
 Joyce Kilmer Park
 Julio Carballo Fields
 Julius Richman Park
 Macombs Dam Park
 Mill Pond Park
 Mullaly Park
 Playground 52
 Printer's Park
 Roberto Clemente State Park (NYSP)
 St. Mary's Park
 Tremont Park

Brooklyn

 100% Playground
 Adam Yauch Park
 Admiral Triangle
 Aimee Triangle
 Alben Square
 Albermarle Playground
 Albert Lysander Parham Playground
 American Playground
 Amersfort Park
 American Veterans Memorial Pier
 Amersfort Park
 Andries Playground
 Anthony Chiarantano Park
 Arbor Place (Brooklyn)
 Asser Levy Park
 Avenue R Mall
 Badame Sessa Memorial Square
 Banneker Playground
 Bar and Grill Park
 Bartel-Pritchard Square
 Bartlett Playground
 Bath Beach Park
 Bath Playground
 Bayview Playground
 Beattie Square
 Beaver Noll Park
 Bedford Playground
 Belmont Playground
 Benson Playground
 Bergen Beach Playground
 Berry Playground
 Berriman Playground
 Betsy Head Park
 Betty Carter Park
 Bensonhurst Park 
 Bildersee Playground
 Bill Brown Memorial Playground
 Boerum Park
 Boulevard Grove (Brooklyn)
 Boyland Park (Brooklyn)
 Breukelen Ballfields Park
 Brevoort Playground
 Brighton Beach Park
 Brighton Playground
 Brooklyn Anchorage Plaza
 Brooklyn Bears Rockwell Plaza Garden
 Brooklyn Botanic Garden
 Brooklyn Bridge Park
 Brooklyn Heights Promenade
 Brooklyn–Queens Greenway
 Brooklyn Waterfront Greenway
 Brower Park
 Brownsville I Ura Park
 Brownsville Playground
 Bush Terminal Park
 Bushwick Fields
 Bushwick Inlet Park
 Bushwick Playground
 Butterfly Gardens (Brooklyn)
 Cadman Plaza
 Calvert Vaux Park
 Campiz Playground
 Canarsie Park
 Callahan-Kelly Playground
 Carroll Park
 Century Playground
 Captain John McKenna IV Park
 Captain Oakley Junior Square
 Carroll Park
 Carver Playground
 Charlie's Place
 Chester Playground
 Chiarantano Playground
 City Line Park
 Classon Playground
 Classon Triangle
 Clumber Corner
 Cobble Hill Park
 Coffey Park
 Cohn Triangle
 Colonel David Marcus Memorial Playground
 Columbus Park
 Commodore Barry Park
 Cough Triangle
 Coney Island Beach & Boardwalk
 Coney Island Creek Park
 Conners Square
 Continental Army Plaza
 Cooper Park (Brooklyn)
 Corporal Wiltshire Triangle
 Cosmo Barone Triangle
 Crispus Attucks Playground
 Cuite Park
 Curtis Park
 Cutinella Triangle
 Cuyler Park
 Cypress Hills Playground
 Dahill Triangle
 David A Fox Playground
 David Ruggles Playground
 De Diego Playground
 Dean Playground
 Decatur Playground
 DeKalb Playground
 Detective Joseph Mayrose Park
 DiGilio Playground
 Dimattina Playground
 Dodger Playground
 Domino Park
 Duke Park
 Dyker Beach Park
 Dyker Heights Playground
 Dyker Beach Park and Golf Course
 East Fourth Street Garden
 Eastern Park
 Edmonds Playground
 El-Shabazz Playground
 Eleanor Roosevelt Playground
 Elijah Stroud Playground
 Elton Playground
 Ennis Park
 Epiphany Playground
 Ericsson Playground
 Ethan Allen Playground
 Eugenio Maria De Hostos Playground
 Evergreen Playground
 Father Giorgio Triangle
 Father Popieluszko Square
 Fermi Playground
 Fidelity Memorial Park
 Fidler-Wyckoff House Park
 Fish Playground
 Floyd Patterson Field
 Floyd Bennett Field (NPS - Gateway National Recreation Area)
 Fort Greene Park
 Fort Hamilton Park
 Fort Hamilton Plaza
 Fraser Square
 Freedom Square
 Four Sparrow Marsh
 Fresh Creek Nature Preserve
 Friends Field
 Fulton Park
 Galapo Playground
 Garden of Union
 Garden Playground
 Garibaldi Playground
 Garibaldi Square
 Gateway Triangle
 George Walker Junior Playground
 Georgia Avenue Garden
 Gethsemane Garden (Brooklyn)
 Glenwood Playground
 Golconda Playground
 Goodwin Gardens
 Gowanus Greenway
 Gowanus Playground
 Grace Playground
 Grady Playground
 Grand Ferry Park
 Grant Gore Triangle
 Gravesend Park
 Gravesend Square
 Green Central Knoll
 Greenwood Playground
 Hancock Playground
 Harmony Park
 Harmony Triangle
 Harry Chapin Playground
 Harry Maze Memorial Park
 Hattie Carthan Garden
 Hattie Carthan Playground
 Hawthorne Field
 Heckscher Playground (Brooklyn)
 Herbert Von King Park
 Heffernan Square
 Heisser Triangle
 Highland Park
 Hillside Park
 Holy Name Square
 Homecrest Playground
 Hot Spot Tot Lot
 Houston Playground
 Howard Playground
 Hull Street Garden
 Human Compass Garden
 Institute Park (Brooklyn)
 Irving Square Park
 Israel Putnam Playground
 Jackie Robinson Park (Brooklyn) - Bedstuy
 Jackie Robinson Park Playground - Crown Heights
 Jacob Joffe Park
 Jacob's Ladder Playground
 Jefferson Field
 Jerome Playground
 Jesse And Charles Dome Playground
 Jesse Owens Playground
 JJ Byrne Park
 John D'Emic Senior Memorial Park
 John J. Carty Park
 John Paul Jones Park
 Kaiser Park
 Kelly Park
 Kennedy-King Playground
 KeySpan Park
 Kosciuszko Pool
 Lady Moody Triangle
 Lafayette Gardens Playground
 Lafayette Playground
 Lafayette Playground
 Leif Ericson Park 7 Square
 Lentol Garden
 Lentol Triangle
 Lieutenant Joseph Petrosino Park
 Lieutenant William E Coffey Square
 Lincoln Terrace Park
 Linden Park
 Lindower Park
 Lindsay Triangle
 Linwood Playground
 Lion's Pride Playground
 Lithuania Square
 Livonia Playground
 Lott Park
 Louis Valentino Junior Park
 Lowry Triangle
 Lt. Federico Narvaez Tot Lot
 Macri Triangle
 Manhattan Beach Park
 Marc And Jason's Playground
 Marcy Green Center
 Marcy Green North
 Marcy Green South
 Maria Hernandez Park
 Marine Park
 Marion-Hopkinson Playground
 Marlboro Playground
 Marsha P. Johnson State Park (NYSP)
 Martin Luther Playground
 Martin Luther King Jr. Playground aka Linton Park
 Martinez Playground
 McCarren Park
 McDonald Playground
 McDonald Square
 McDonald Triangle
 McGolrick Park
 McKinley Park
 Mcguire Fields
 McLaughlin Park
 Mellett Playground
 Memorial Gore
 Meucci Square
 Middleton Playground
 Milestone Park
 Monastery Square
 Monsignor Crawford Field
 Monsignor McGolrick Park
 Mother Cabrini Park
 Mount Carmel Square
 Mount Prospect Park
 Narrows Botanical Gardens
 Nautilus Playground
 Nehemiah Park
 Newport Playground
 Newton Barge Terminal Playground
 Nicholas A Brizzi Playground
 North Pacific Playground
 Nostrand Playground
 Ocean Hill Playground
 Onehundred Percent Playground
 Oracle Playground
 Orient Grove
 Owl's Head Park
 Oxport Playground
 Pacific Playground
 Paerdegat Basin Park
 Paerdegat Park
 Parade Ground (Flatbush, Brooklyn)
 Park Slope Playground
 Parkside Playground
 Payne Park (Brooklyn)
 Penn Triangle
 Person Square
 Pierrepont Playground
 Pigeon Plaza
 Pink Playground
 Playground Three Forty
 Police Officer Reinaldo Salgado Playground
 Powell Playground
 Power Playground
 Pratt Playground
 Private First Class Thomas Norton Memorial Playground
 Private Sonsire Triangle
 Prospect Park
 Public School 1 Playground
 Public School 125 Playground
 Public School 4 Paradise Garden
 Pulaski Playground
 Quaker Parrot Park at the Dust Bowl
 Rachel Haber Cohen Playground
 Railroad Playground
 Rainbow Playground
 Ramirez Playground
 Red Hook Park
 Remsen Playground
 Right Triangle Playground
 Robert E. Venable Park
 Roberto Clemente Ballfield
 Rodney Park Center
 Rodney Park North
 Rodney Park South
 Rodney Playground Center
 Rodney Playground North
 Rodney Playground South
 Roebling Playground
 Rolf Henry Playground
 Russell Pederson Playground
 Saint Andrews Playground
 St. Johns Park
 Saint Nicholas-Olive Street Garden
 Saint Nicholas-Powers Street Garden
 Sam Leggio Triangle
 Samuel Goldberg Triangle
 Saratoga Park
 Saratoga Ballfields
 Sarsfield Playground
 Scarangella Park
 Schenk Playground
 Seeley Park
 Sergeant Joyce Kilmer Triangle
 Sergeant William Dougherty Playground
 Seth Low Playground
 Sheepshead Playground
 Shore Park and Parkway
 Sid Luckman Field
 Sixteen Trees Triangle
 Sledge Playground
 Slope Park
 Sobel Green
 Sperandeo Brothers Playground
 Spring Creek Park
 Stephen A Rudd Playground
 Sternberg Park
 Steuben Playground
 Stockton Playground
 Stuyvesant Park
 Success Garden
 Sumner Playground
 Sunset Park
 Taaffe Playground
 Ten Eyck Plaza
 Terrapin Playground
 The Amazing Garden
 Thomas Greene Playground
 Tiger Playground
 Tilden Playground
 Todd Memorial Square
 Trinity Park
 Trust Triangle
 Umma Park
 Under The Tracks Playground
 Underwood Park
 University Plaza
 Van Dyke Playground
 Van Voorhees Park
 Vincent V Abate Playground
 Walt Whitman Park
  Washington Park
 Washington Hall Park
 Washington Plaza (Brooklyn)
 Weeksville Playground
 Weinburg Triangle
 West Playground
 Whitman Park (Brooklyn)
 William Sunners Playground
 Willoughby Playground
 Wilson Playground
 Wingate Park
 WNYC Transmitter Park
 Woodruff Playground
 Zion Triangle

Manhattan

 79th Street Boat Basin
 Abingdon Square Park
 Albert Capsouto Park
 Asphalt Green
 The Battery
 Bella Abzug (Hudson) Park
 Bennett Park
 Blackwell Island Light, Roosevelt Island
 British Garden at Hanover Square
 Bowling Green
 Bryant Park
 Captain Patrick J. Brown Walk
 Carl Schurz Park
 Central Park
 Chelsea Park
 City Hall Park
 Collect Pond
 Columbus Park
 Corlears Hook
 Dag Hammarskjold Plaza
 Damrosch Park
 Dante Park
 DeSalvio Playground
 DeWitt Clinton Park
 Drumgoole Plaza
 Duane Park
 East River Greenway
 East River Esplanade
 East River Park
 Stuyvesant Cove
 Father Demo Square
 Finn Square
 Foley Square
 Fort Tryon Park
 Fort Washington Park
 Franklin D. Roosevelt Four Freedoms Park (NYSP)
 Gorman Park
 Governors Island
 Governors Island National Monument (NPS)
 Gramercy Park
 Greenacre Park
 Hamilton Fish Park
 Hanover Square
 Harlem River Park
 Hell's Kitchen Park
 Herald Square
 High Line
 Highbridge Park
 Holcombe Rucker Park
 Hudson River Park
 Imagination Playground at Burling Slip
 Inwood Hill Park
 Isham Park
 Jay Hood Wright Park
 Jackie Robinson Park
 Jackson Square Park
 John Jay Park
 Liberty Park
 Louis Cuvillier Park
 Madison Square
 Manhattan Waterfront Greenway
 Marcus Garvey Park
 Mill Rock Park
 Mitchell Square Park
 Morningside Park
 Murphy Brothers Playground
 Muscota Marsh
 Paley Park
 Peretz Square
 Cooper Triangle
 Plaza Lafayette
 Queen Elizabeth II September 11th Garden
 Ralph Bunche Park
 Randalls and Wards Islands
 Richard Tucker Square
 Riverbank State Park (NYSP)
 Riverside Park
 Robert Moses Playground
 Roosevelt Triangle
 Rucker Park
 Sakura Park
 Samuel N. Bennerson 2nd Playground
 Sara Delano Roosevelt Park
 Septuagesimo Uno
 Seward Park
 Sheridan Square
 Sherman Square
 Southpoint Park, Roosevelt Island
 St. Nicholas Park
 St. Vartan Park
 Straus Park
 Stuyvesant Square
 Sunshine Playground
 Swindler Cove Park
 Teardrop Park
 Theodore Roosevelt Park
 Thomas Jefferson Park
 Thomas Paine Park
 Tompkins Square Park
 Tribeca Park
 Union Square
 Verdi Square
 Vesuvio Playground
 Randalls and Wards Islands
 Washington Market Park
 Washington Square Park
 West Harlem Piers
 West Side Community Garden
 Winston Churchill Park
 Zuccotti Park

Queens

 Admiral Park
 Alley Park
 Alley Pond Park
 Andrews Grove
 Astoria Park
 Baisley Pond Park
 Bayside Fields
 Bayswater Park
 Bayswater Point State Park (NYSP)
 Beach Channel Park
 Big Bush Park
 Bowne Park
 Brant Point Wildlife Sanctuary
 Breininger Park
 Broad Channel American Park
 Broad Channel Park
 Broad Channel Wetlands
 Brooklyn–Queens Greenway
 Brookville Park
 Bulova Park
 Captain Tilly Park
 Crocheron Park
 Cunningham Park
 Detective Keith L Williams Park
 Detective William T. Gunn Park
 Dr. Charles R. Drew Park
 Dubos Point Wildlife Sanctuary
 Doughboy Park
 Douglaston Park
 Elmhurst Park
 Evergreen Park
 Flushing Fields
 Flushing Meadows–Corona Park
 Forest Park
 Fort Tilden (NPS - Gateway National Recreation Area)
 Fort Totten
 Francis Lewis Park
 Frank Golden Park
 Frank M. Charles Memorial Park
 Frank Principe Park
 Gantry Plaza State Park (NYSP)
 Haggerty Park
 Harvey Park
 Highland Park
 Hinton Park
 Hoffman Park
 Hook Creek Park
 Hunter's Point Park
 Idlewild Park
 Jamaica Bay Park
 Jamaica Bay Wildlife Refuge (NPS - Gateway National Recreation Area)
 Jacob Riis Park (NPS - Gateway National Recreation Area)
 John Golden Park
 Juniper Valley Park
 Kissena Park
 Kohlreiter Square
 Libra Triangle
 Linnaeus Park
 Little Bay Park
 Louis Pasteur Park
 Mafera Park
 Macneil Park
 Marconi Park
 Marie Curie Park
 Montbellier Park
 O'Donohue Park
 Overlook Park
 Park of the Americas
 Phil "Scooter" Rizzuto
 Police Officer Edward Byrne Park
 Powell's Cove Park
 Queens Botanical Garden
 Queens County Farm Museum
 Queens Zoo
 Queensbridge Park
 Rachel Carson Playground
 Railroad Park
 Ralph Demarco Park
 Rochdale Park
 Rockaway Beach and Boardwalk
 Rockaway Community Park
 Roy Wilkins Park
 Rufus King Park
 Seagirt Avenue Wetlands
 Socrates Sculpture Park
 Spring Creek Park
 Springfield Park
 St. Albans Park
 Travers Park
 Triangle 54
 Tudor Park
 Udall's Park Preserve
 Wayanda Park

Staten Island

 Aesop Park
 Allison Pond Park
 Amundsen Circle
 Annadale Green
 Arbutus Woods Park
 Arden Woods
 Alice Austen House
 Barrett Park
 Bayview Terrace Park
 Blood Root Valley
 Bloomingdale Park
 Blue Heron Park Preserve
 Blueberry Park
 Bradys Park
 Bunker Ponds Park
 Buono Beach
 Carlton Park
 Clay Pit Ponds State Park Preserve (NYSP)
 Clove Lakes Park
 Clove's Tail
 Conference House Park
 Corporal Thompson Park
 Crescent Beach Park
 Deere Park
 Eibs Pond Park
 Faber Pool and Park
 Fairview Park
 Father Macris Park
 Forest Grove
 Fort Hill Park
 Fort Wadsworth (NPS - Gateway National Recreation Area)
 South Beach–FDR Boardwalk
 Freshkills Park
 Gaeta Park
 Great Kills Park (NPS - Gateway National Recreation Area)
 Graniteville Quarry Park
 Graniteville Swamp Park
 Hero Park
 High Rock Park Preserve
 Huguenot Ponds Park
 Hybrid Oak Woods Park
 Ingram Woods
 Jones Woods Park
 Joseph Manna Park
 King Fisher Park
 Kingdom Pond Park
 Last Chance Pond Park
 LaTourette Park and Golf Course
 Lemon Creek
 Long Pond Park
 General Douglas MacArthur Park
 Maple Woods
 Mariners Marsh Park
 Meredith Woods
 Midland Beach
 Midland Field
 Miller Field (NPS - Gateway National Recreation Area)
 Mount Loretto Unique Area
 New Dorp Beach
 Northerleigh Park
 Ocean Breeze Park
 Old Place Creek Park
 Olmsted-Beil House Park
 Reed's Basket Willow Swamp Park
 Richmond Terrace Wetlands
 Sailors' Snug Harbor
 Staten Island Botanical Garden
 New York Chinese Scholar's Garden
 Saw Mill Creek Marsh
 Schmul Park
 Seaside Wildlife Nature Park
 Siedenburg Park
 Silver Lake
 Sobel Court Park
 South Beach Wetlands
 St. George Park
 Staten Island Greenbelt
 Staten Island Industrial Park
 Tappen Park
 Tompkinsville Park
 Tottenville Shore Park
 Von Briesen Park
 Walker Park
 Wegener Park
 Westerleigh Park
 Westwood Park
 Willowbrook Park
 Wolfe's Pond Park

* Denotes playgrounds jointly operated with the New York City Department of Education.

List of former parks by borough

Manhattan
 St. John's Park

See also
 10-Minute Walk
 List of privately owned public spaces in New York City
 List of New York state parks
 New York City Department of Parks and Recreation
 Park Conservancy
 List of New York City parks relating to Hispanic and Latino American culture
 List of New York City parks relating to Irish American culture
 List of New York City parks relating to Jewish culture
 List of New York City parks relating to the Vietnam War
 List of New York City parks relating to World War I
 Skateparks in New York City

References

External links
 Interactive search page provided by the Department of Parks and Recreation
 New York City Department of Parks & Recreation
 City Parks - documentary produced by Treasures of New York

New York City
Parks
Parks
List of parks
Air pollution in New York City